Synthesizers.com is an American company based in Tyler, Texas,
founded by engineer Roger Arrick (also a designer of robots), which manufactures analog modular synthesizers for music and sound-effect creation.

Products
Synthesizers.com modular synthesizer products use analog circuitry as did the classic synthesizers produced by Moog, ARP, etc. Systems are constructed using function modules to provide customization and flexibility. Modules include the basic VCO, VCF, VCA synthesizer functions along with more advanced modules such as
sequencers, ring modulators and quantizers. Cabinets of various construction styles are offered to house modules and power components.

Synthesizers.com cabinets and modules conform to the physical Moog Modular (5U tall) form factor.

Moog 960 Sequencer Reissue
In 2005, Synthesizers.com began offering a clone of Moog's famous 960 sequencer. The front panel duplicates the original 960 layout while the electronics required a redesign using currently available circuit components. Recreation of Moog's 961 and 962 accessory modules are offered as well.

Meeting of the Knobs
Synthesizers.com periodically hosts informal public meetings in the Dallas/Fort Worth area where enthusiasts show various sorts of modern and vintage electronic musical instruments.

Gallery

References

External links
 Official homepage of Synthesizers.com

Synthesizer manufacturing companies of the United States
Modular synthesizers
Analog synthesizers
MIDI instruments
Companies based in Tyler, Texas
Companies established in 1996
1996 establishments in Texas